UFC 176: Aldo vs. Mendes II was a planned mixed martial arts event that was scheduled to be held by the Ultimate Fighting Championship on August 2, 2014, at Staples Center in Los Angeles, California.

Background
The event was expected to be headlined by a UFC Featherweight Championship rematch between the former champion José Aldo and challenger Chad Mendes. Their first fight at UFC 142 ended in a first round KO victory in favor of Aldo. However, on July 2, Aldo pulled out of the fight due to an injury suffered in training.

Subsequent to Aldo's injury, the event was cancelled on July 8, when the UFC announced they were unable to replace the original main event fight and with less than a month before the event, the decision was made to postpone the event – though the promotion said the numbering scheme for already scheduled pay-per-views after it will remain in consecutive order. The fights booked for this event were shifted to other upcoming cards. Aldo and Mendes eventually fought at UFC 179.

This was the second time, following UFC 151 in August 2012, that the promotion was forced to cancel an event because of a lack of a high profile fight to fill a main event spot.

Cancelled fight card

Popular culture
The event was fictionalized in the 2012 film Here Comes the Boom. In the film it took place the MGM Grand in Las Vegas. The main event in the film was Junior Dos Santos against Shane Carwin. The film's main character Scott Voss, played by Kevin James, fights fictional fighter Ken "The Executioner" Dietric, played by former UFC fighter Krzysztof Soszynski. UFC Hall of Famer Bas Rutten plays Voss's trainer Niko. The film also includes cameos from Joe Rogan, Mike Goldberg, Chael Sonnen, Brian Stann, Herb Dean, Wanderlei Silva, Jacob "Stitch" Duran, and Bruce Buffer all playing themselves.

See also
List of UFC events
2014 in UFC

References

Ultimate Fighting Championship events
Mixed martial arts in Los Angeles
2014 in mixed martial arts
Cancelled Ultimate Fighting Championship events